Scopula sagittilinea is a moth of the family Geometridae. It was described by Warren in 1897. It is found in Kenya, Somalia and Tanzania.

References

Moths described in 1897
sagittilinea
Moths of Africa
Taxa named by William Warren (entomologist)